Mark Anatolievich Minkov  (25 November 1944 – 29 May 2012) was a Soviet / Russian music composer. His music is featured in a number of operas, ballets, stage performances, and films.

He composed the scores for more than a hundred cinema and television films, including Investigation Held by ZnaToKi (1985), We Are from Jazz (1983), Neznayka with Our Court (1983) and the In port animated film.

His awards included an Honoured Cultural Worker of Russia Federation, Laureate Awards of the All-Union and International composer contests.

He was the President of the Russian Cinematic Composers Guild, an acting member of the Russian Cinematic Academy Nika Award, a member of the Composers Union (1970), and a member of the Cinematographers Union (1981).

Early life and career
Minkov was born in Moscow, USSR.  He attended the Merzlyakovki Conservatory School where he studied composition under Nikolay Sidelnikov. He then studied under Aram Khachaturian at the Moscow Conservatory in 1964.

He was awarded the Golden Pushkin Medal (1999) for "his contribution to the development, preservation and multiplication of the national cultural traditions, help and support of the creative intelligentsia, and development and forming of newer styles and directions in culture".

A song by Minkov based on the lyrics Invisible struggle (translit. Nezrimiy Boi - If somebody, somewhere among us, sometimes...) by Anatoly Gorokhov is featured in almost all the series. It became an unofficial hymn of the Soviet Militia. In 2001, he was awarded the MVD Russian Interior Ministry award for the music theme to the Sledstvie vedut znatoki.

In 2003, Minkov became a People's Artist of Russia.

References

External links

1944 births
2012 deaths
Russian composers
Russian male composers
Musicians from Moscow
Soviet film score composers
Male film score composers
Moscow Conservatory alumni
People's Artists of Russia
Soviet Jews
Russian Jews
20th-century Russian male musicians